Alida Garcia is an American social activist whose major work centers on immigration issues.

Career

Garcia currently serves as the Vice President of Advocacy for FWD.us, a lobbying group co-founded by Mark Zuckerberg. She previously served as Director of Coalitions & Policy. Some main goals of the initiative are to provide immigration reform, enhance the education system and invest in the sciences. Additionally, she is the Co-Founder & Executive Director of Inclusv.

References

Place of birth missing (living people)
Year of birth missing (living people)
Living people
Immigrant rights activists
American women lawyers
American lawyers
21st-century American women